Kittisak Hochin (born January 19, 1994) is a Thai professional footballer who plays as a forward.

External links
 

1994 births
Living people
Kittisak Hochin
Kittisak Hochin
Association football forwards
Kittisak Hochin
Kittisak Hochin
Kittisak Hochin
Kittisak Hochin
Kittisak Hochin
Kittisak Hochin